Malcolm E. "Mac" Steen was a college football player and orthodontist. Steen was a prominent tackle for coach Ray Graves' Florida Gators of the University of Florida from 1967 to 1969. Graves rated Steen as the Gators best right tackle of the 1960s. He was the senior team captain in 1969.

See also
 List of University of Florida Athletic Hall of Fame members

References

American football tackles
Florida Gators football players